The Team sprint large hill/2 × 7,5 km event of the FIS Nordic World Ski Championships 2017 WAS held on 3 March 2017.

Results

Ski jumping
The ski jumping part was started at 16:00.

Cross-country skiing
The cross-country skiing part was started at 18:15.

References

Team sprint large hill 2 x 7,5 km